Koch's Island can refer to: 

 Koch Island
 Koch snowflake